The icosathlon, also called the double decathlon, is an ultra multi-event of track and field competition consisting of 20 events contested over two days. There is an extra rule, that each day should contain a pause of one hour. Mostly the competition is held over two days, but one-day icosathlons also exist. The first day of the standard icosathlon includes:
 100 metres
 Long jump
 200 metres hurdles
 Shot put
 5000 metres
 pause
 800 metres
 High jump
 400 metres
 Hammer throw
 3000 meter steeplechase

On the second day of the standard icosathlon, the following events are contested:
 110 metres hurdles
 Discus throw
 200 metres
 Pole vault
 3000 metres
 pause
 400 metres hurdles
 Javelin throw
 1500 metres
 Triple jump
 10000 m

Each event is scored according to the decathlon scoring tables or, for non-decathlon events, the World Athletics points tables. At the conclusion of each icosathlon, the competitor with the highest point total is declared the winner.

The event is overseen by the International Association for Ultra Multievents (IAUM), which also holds the tetradecathlon based on the women's heptathlon. The men's world record for the standard icosathlon of 14,571 is held by Joseph Detmer of the United States. The women's world record of 11,091 is held by Kelly Rodmell.

World Championships

EC – European Championships (non-World Championship year)

WI - World Invitational (non-World Championship year)

'*Inaugural Icosathlon World Championship for Women

World Championship Medal Totals 

NOTE: Only Medal totals since 1990.

Indoor equivalent 
For indoor ultra-multievent meetings, all competitors compete in an indoor tetradecathlon, spanning 14 events over 2 days. These events are as follows:

Day 1
 60m dash
 Long jump
 800m
 Shot put
 400m
 High jump
 3000m

Day 2
 60m hurdles
 Pole vault
 1500m
 Weight throw
 200m
 Triple jump
 5000m

Unlike in outdoor ultra multi event competitions, the number and order of events is the same for both genders.

Records
Men
 Icosathlon : 14571 points -  - 2010 (Lynchburg, USA)
 Indoor Tetradecathlon : 8478 points -  - 2018 (Helsinki, Finland)

Women
 Icosathlon : 11091 points -  - 2004 (Melbourne, Australia)
 Outdoor Tetradecathlon : 10798 points -  - 2002 (Turku, Finland)
 Indoor Tetradecathlon : 7925 points -  - 2016 (Helsinki, Finland)

This table of records is not officially acknowledged by the World Athletics but is considered by the International Association for Ultra Multievents (IAUM) as the best performance of all time since the foundation of the discipline in 1981.

Competitions
The IAUM sponsors an icosathlon and tetradecathlon every year at the IAUM World Championships. The 2012 World Championships were held in Turnhout, Belgium. In addition, a variety of other icosathlon events are held, most notably the annual Dutch Double Decathlon, held in Delft, Netherlands. The 2015 event was held 19–20 September. The last European Championships were held on 6 and 7 September 2014 in Lodi, Lombardy, Italy (near Milan). The upcoming European Championships was held from 27–28 August 2016 in Cambridge, England. The 2017 event was held in Turnhout, Belgium and 2018 in Delft, Netherlands. The 2019 championship was held in Helsinki, Finland and the 2021 event was held in Épinal, France.

References

External links
 International Association for Ultra Multievents (IAUM official website)

Combined track and field events